Joao Andrés Urbáez Gómez (born 24 July 2002) is a professional footballer who plays as a centre-back or right-back for the Alcorcón B. Born in Spain, he plays for the Dominican Republic national team.

Club career
Urbáez is a youth product of the academies of Canillas, Móstoles and Alcorcón. He was promoted to Alcorcón B in August 2021, after making his debut with them in May 2021.

International career
Born in Spain, Urbáez is of Dominican descent. He is a one-time representative of the Dominican Republic U23s in 2021. He was called up to the Dominican Republic national team for matches in June 2022. He debuted with the Dominican Republic in a 3–2 CONCACAF Nations League loss to French Guiana on 5 June 2022.

References

External links
 
 
 AD Alcorcón profile

2002 births
Living people
Footballers from Madrid
Citizens of the Dominican Republic through descent
Dominican Republic footballers
Dominican Republic youth international footballers
Dominican Republic international footballers
Spanish footballers
Spanish people of Dominican Republic descent
Sportspeople of Dominican Republic descent
AD Alcorcón B players
Tercera Federación players
Association football fullbacks